The Melancholy of Resistance is a 1989 novel by the Hungarian writer László Krasznahorkai. The narrative is set in a restless town where a mysterious circus, which exhibits a whale and nothing else, contributes to an apocalyptic atmosphere. Krasznahorkai adapted the novel into a screenplay for the 2000 film Werckmeister Harmonies, directed by Béla Tarr.

Reception
James Wood of The New Yorker wrote in 2011: "The Melancholy of Resistance is a comedy of apocalypse, a book about a God that not only failed but didn't even turn up for the exam. Less manic, less entrapped than War and War, it has elements of a traditional social novel." Wood continued: "The Melancholy of Resistance is a demanding book, and a pessimistic one, too, since it seems to take repeated ironic shots at the possibility of revolution. ... The pleasure of the book, and a kind of resistance, as well, flows from its extraordinary, stretched, self-recoiling sentences, which are marvels of a loosely punctuated stream of consciousness."

See also
 1989 in literature
 Hungarian literature

References

1989 novels
Hungarian novels
Hungarian novels adapted into films
Postmodern novels
Works by László Krasznahorkai
Magvető books